Johann Gottfried Gottlob Mühlig (29 January 1812, Kalbsrieth - 12 April 1884, Frankfurt am Main) was a German ornithologist and entomologist.

Mühlig is best known for his studies of Microlepidoptera. He described several new species including Coleophora odorariella and Coleophora asteris. He was a Member of the Entomological Society of Stettin and a friend of the Swiss entomologist Heinrich Frey.

References
Derksen, W. Scheiding-Göllner, U. 1965–1975. Index litteraturae entomologicae. Serie II: Die Welt-Literatur über die gesamte Entomologie von 1864 bis 1900. 5 vols. Deutsche Akademie der Landwirtschaftswissenschaften, Berlin

External links
Johann Gottfried Gottlieb Muhlig
Natur und Museum 1884 (Obituary) 

German entomologists
German ornithologists
1812 births
1884 deaths